Schlein is a German- and Yiddish-language surname. Notable people with the surname include:

 Elly Schlein (born 1985), Italian politician
 Michael Schlein (born 1961), American entrepreneur, president and CEO of Accion
 Miriam Schlein (1926–2004), American author
 Rory Schlein (born 1984), Australian international speedway rider
 Ted Schlein, general partner of Kleiner Perkins Caufield & Byers